Larrivière-Saint-Savin is a commune in the Landes department in Nouvelle-Aquitaine in south-western France.

The commune was formerly called Larrivière, and was officially renamed Larrivière-Saint-Savin on 7 July 2006.

References

See also
Communes of the Landes department

Larrivieresaintsavin